Samuel Langhorne Clemens (November 30, 1835 – April 21, 1910),⁣ well known by his pen name Mark Twain, was an American author and humorist. Twain is noted for his novels Adventures of Huckleberry Finn (1884), which has been called the "Great American Novel," and The Adventures of Tom Sawyer (1876). He also wrote poetry, short stories, essays, and non-fiction.  His big break was "The Celebrated Jumping Frog of Calaveras County" (1867).

Novels
 The Gilded Age: A Tale of Today (1873) 
 The Prince and the Pauper (1881)
 A Connecticut Yankee in King Arthur's Court (1889)
 The American Claimant (1892)
 Pudd'nhead Wilson (1894)
 Personal Recollections of Joan of Arc (1896)
 A Horse's Tale (1907)
 The Mysterious Stranger (1916, posthumous)

Tom Sawyer and Huckleberry Finn
 The Adventures of Tom Sawyer (1876)
 Adventures of Huckleberry Finn (1884)
 Tom Sawyer Abroad (1894)
 Tom Sawyer, Detective (1896)
 "Huck Finn and Tom Sawyer Among the Indians" (c. 1884, 9 chapters, unfinished)
 "Huck Finn" (c. 1897, fragment)
 "Schoolhouse Hill" (in  The Mysterious Stranger) (c. 1898, 6 chapters, unfinished)
 "Tom Sawyer’s Conspiracy" (c. 1899, 10 chapters, unfinished)
 "Tom Sawyer’s Gang Plans a Naval Battle" (c. 1900, fragment)

Adam and Eve
 "Extracts from Adam's Diary", illustrated by Frederick Strothmann (1904)
 "Eve's Diary", illustrated by Lester Ralph (1906) 
 "The Private Life of Adam and Eve: Being Extracts from Their Diaries, Translated from the Original Mss." (Harper, 1931),  – posthumous issue of the 1904 and 1906 works bound as one, as Twain had requested in a recently discovered letter

Short stories
 "The Celebrated Jumping Frog of Calaveras County" (1865)
 "General Washington's Negro Body-Servant" (1868)
 "Cannibalism in the Cars" (1868)
 "A Medieval Romance" [1868] (unfinished)
 "My Late Senatorial Secretaryship" (1868)
Mark Twain vs Blondin [1869 satire letter]]
 "A Ghost Story" (1870)
 "A True Story, Repeated Word for Word As I Heard It" (1874)
 "Some Learned Fables for Good Old Boys and Girls" (1875)
 "The Story Of The Bad Little Boy" (1875)
 "The Story Of The Good Little Boy" (1875)
 "A Literary Nightmare" (1876)
 "A Murder, a Mystery, and a Marriage" (1876)
 "The Canvasser's Tale" (1876)
 "The Invalid's Story" (1877)
 "The Great Revolution in Pitcairn" (1879)
 "1601: Conversation, as it was by the Social Fireside, in the Time of the Tudors" (1880)
 "The McWilliamses and the Burglar Alarm" (1882)
 "The Stolen White Elephant" (1882)
 "Luck" (1891)
 "Those Extraordinary Twins" (1892)
 "Is He Living Or Is He Dead?" (1893)
 "The Esquimau Maiden's Romance" (1893)
 "The Million Pound Bank Note" (1893)
 "The Man That Corrupted Hadleyburg" (1900)
 "A Double Barrelled Detective Story" (1902)
 "A Dog's Tale" (1904)
 "The War Prayer" (1905)
 "Hunting the Deceitful Turkey" (1906)
 "A Fable" (1909)
 "Captain Stormfield's Visit to Heaven" (1909)
 "My Platonic Sweetheart" (1912, posthumous)
 "The Purloining of Prince Oleomargarine" (2017, posthumous)

Collections
Short story collections
 The Celebrated Jumping Frog of Calaveras County and Other Sketches (1867), short story collection
 Mark Twain's (Burlesque) Autobiography and First Romance (1871), short story collection
 Sketches New and Old (1875), short story collection
 A True Story and the Recent Carnival of Crime (1877), short story collection
 Punch, Brothers, Punch! and Other Sketches (1878), short story collection
 Mark Twain's Library of Humor (1888), short story collection
 Merry Tales (1892), short story collection
 The £1,000,000 Bank Note and Other New Stories (1893), short story collection
 The $30,000 Bequest and Other Stories (1906), short story collection
 The Curious Republic of Gondour and Other Whimsical Sketches (1919, posthumous), short story collection
 The Washoe Giant in San Francisco (1938, posthumous), short story collection
 Mark Twain's Fables of Man (1972, posthumous), short story collection
Essay collections
 Memoranda (1870–1871), essay collection from Galaxy 
 How to Tell a Story and other Essays (1897)
 Europe and Elsewhere (1923, posthumous), edited by Albert Bigelow Paine
 Letters from the Earth (1962, posthumous)
 A Pen Warmed Up In Hell (1972, posthumous)
 The Bible According to Mark Twain (1996, posthumous)

Essays
 "Advice to Little Girls" (1865)
"On the Decay of the Art of Lying" (1880)
 "The Awful German Language" (1880)
 "Advice to Youth" (1882)
 "Fenimore Cooper's Literary Offenses" (1895)
 "English As She Is Taught" (1897)
 "Concerning the Jews" (1898)
 "My First Lie, and How I Got Out of It" (1899)
 "A Salutation Speech From the Nineteenth Century to the Twentieth" (1900)
 "To the Person Sitting in Darkness" (1901)
 "To My Missionary Critics" (1901)
 "Edmund Burke on Croker and Tammany" (1901)
 "What Is Man?" (1906)
 "Christian Science" (1907)
 "Queen Victoria's Jubilee" (1910)
 "The United States of Lyncherdom" (1923, posthumous)

Non-fiction
 The Innocents Abroad (1869), travel
 Roughing It (1872), travel
 Old Times on the Mississippi (1876), travel
 Some Rambling Notes of an Idle Excursion (1877), travel
 A Tramp Abroad (1880), travel
 Life on the Mississippi (1883), travel
 Following the Equator (sometimes titled "More Tramps Abroad") (1897), travel
 Is Shakespeare Dead? (1909)
 Moments with Mark Twain (1920, posthumous) 
 Mark Twain's Notebook (1935, posthumous)
 Letters from Hawaii (letters written in 1866, published as a book in 1947)

Other writings
 Is He Dead? (1898), play
 The Battle Hymn of the Republic, Updated (1901), satirical lyric
 King Leopold's Soliloquy (1905), satire
 Little Bessie Would Assist Providence (1908), poem
 Slovenly Peter (1935, posthumous), children's book
 Some Thoughts on the Science of Onanism (1879), a speech given to The Stomach Club

Autobiography and letters
 Mark Twain's Autobiography
Chapters from My Autobiography published by North American Review (1906–1907)
Posthumous edition compiled and edited by Albert Bigelow Paine (1924)
Posthumous edition named Mark Twain in Eruption compiled and edited by Bernard DeVoto (1940)
Posthumous edition compiled and edited by Charles Neider
Posthumous edition compiled and edited by Harriet Elinor Smith and the Mark Twain Project: Volume 1 (2010)
Posthumous edition compiled and edited by Robert Hirst and the Mark Twain Project: Volume 2 (2013)
Posthumous edition compiled and edited by Harriet Elinor Smith and the Mark Twain Project: Volume 3 (2015)
 Mark Twain's Letters, 1853–1880 (2010, posthumous)
 "Territorial Enterprise letters" being compiled for release in 2017.

References
Notes

Citations

 
Bibliographies by writer
Bibliographies of American writers
Journalism bibliographies